William B. Duke (December 5, 1857 - January 26, 1926) was a U. S. Racing Hall of Fame trainer of Thoroughbred racehorses who won eight French Classic Races, was a five-time national champion trainer in France and, after returning to the United States in late 1924, won the 1925 Kentucky Derby and the 1925 Preakness Stakes.

Little more than a year after he returned to the United States, William Duke died at his home in Wellsville, New York on January 26, 1926.

References

1857 births
1926 deaths
French horse trainers
American horse trainers
United States Thoroughbred Racing Hall of Fame inductees
People from Allegany County, New York